Darb Bagh (also Romanized as Darb Bāgh and Darb-e Bāgh; also known as Darbāgh and Darreh Bāgh) is a village in Zardeyn Rural District, Nir District, Taft County, Yazd Province, Iran. At the 2006 census, its population was 76, in 34 families.

References 

Populated places in Taft County